Jin-young, also spelled Jin-yeong or Jean-young, is a unisex Korean given name. Its meaning differs based on the hanja used to write each syllable of the name. There are 48 hanja with the reading "jin" and 41 hanja with the reading "young" on the South Korean government's official list of hanja which may be registered for use in given names.

People with this name include:

Film and television
 Jung Jin-young (born 1964), South Korean actor
 Choi Jin-young (1970–2010), South Korean actor and pop singer
 Jang Jin-young (1974–2009), South Korean actress
 Son Jin-young (born 1985), South Korean actor and singer

Singers
 Hyun Jin-young (born 1971), South Korean male rapper
 Park Jin-young (born 1971), South Korean male singer-songwriter and chairman of JYP Entertainment
 Jang Jin-young (singer) (born 1983), South Korean male singer and vocal trainer for S.M. Entertainment
 Hong Jin-young (born 1985), South Korean female trot singer
 Son Jin-young (born 1985), South Korean male singer
 Jung Jin-young (singer) (born 1991), South Korean male singer, member of boy band B1A4
 Punch (singer) (born Bae Jin-yeong, 1993), South Korean female singer
 Jinyoung (entertainer, born 1994), South Korean male singer, member of boy band Got7
 Woo Jin-young (born 1997), South Korean male singer and rapper, member of boy band D1ce
 Bae Jin-young (born 2000), South Korean male singer, member of boy band CIX

Sportspeople
 Kim Jin-yeong (born 1970), South Korean female cyclist
 Lee Jin-young (born 1980), South Korean male baseball player (Korea Baseball Organization)
 Kwon Jin-young (born 1991), South Korean male football right back
 Ko Jin-young (born 1995), South Korean female golfer
 Park Jin-young (swimmer) (born 1997), South Korean female swimmer

See also
List of Korean given names
Young-jin, the same syllables in the opposite order

References

Korean unisex given names